Anatrachyntis oxyptila is a moth in the family Cosmopterigidae. It was described by Edward Meyrick in 1928, and is known from New Ireland.

References

Moths described in 1928
Anatrachyntis
Moths of New Guinea